Air Vice Marshal Richard Howard Lacey,  (born 11 December 1953) is a retired Royal Air Force officer who served as the Commander of British Forces Cyprus and UK National Military Representative to the NATO HQ at SHAPE in Belgium.

Education
Lacey was educated at John Ruskin Grammar School, University of Cambridge, the RAF College Cranwell and the Royal College of Defence Studies.

Flying career
Lacey joined the Royal Air Force (RAF) in 1972. He qualified as a helicopter pilot in 1978 and completed operational flying tours in Northern Ireland and Hong Kong.  He trained as a helicopter flying instructor in 1984 and on promotion to squadron leader in 1985, he returned to operational flying in Northern Ireland as a Flight Commander with No 72 Squadron.  After attending the RAF Staff College he was appointed Personal Staff Officer to Chief of Staff at RAF Strike Command (then Commander-in-Chief for the Gulf War) in 1989. He became Commanding Officer of No. 33 Squadron in 1992, a staff officer for Air Plans and Programmes at the Ministry of Defence in 1994 and Station Commander at RAF Benson in 1997. After that he attended the Royal College of Defence Studies whereupon he was made Director of NATO Policy at the Ministry of Defence in 2000, Commander of British Forces on the Falkland Islands in 2003 and UK Military Representative to SHAPE in Belgium in 2005. Lacey was appointed a Commander of the Order of the British Empire in the 2004 New Year Honours. His last appointment was as Commander of British Forces Cyprus and Administrator of the Sovereign Base Areas in 2006 before retiring in 2009.

Retirement
After retirement, Lacey became Director of Strategy at Sodexo Defence Ltd. He is currently a Gentleman Usher to Queen Elizabeth II.

References

1953 births
British military in Cyprus
Commanders of the Order of the British Empire
Graduates of the Royal Air Force College Cranwell
Living people
People educated at John Ruskin Grammar School
Royal Air Force air marshals
Royal Air Force personnel of the Gulf War